Cheryl C. Kagan (born July 2, 1961) is an American politician in the U.S. state of Maryland who has represented District 17 in the Maryland Senate (Rockville & Gaithersburg) in Montgomery County since 2015. She is a member of the Democratic Party. Prior to her service in the Maryland Senate, she served in the Maryland House of Delegates from 1995 to 2003, representing the same district.

Early and professional life
Kagan was born in Washington, D.C. in 1961 and grew up in suburban Montgomery County, Maryland, graduating from Winston Churchill High School. She earned a bachelor's degree in political science from Vassar College in 1983 and later attended the School of Public Affairs at the University of Maryland, College Park. Following her studies, she launched her career in government and in the nonprofit sector. Among the organizations she was involved in are National Abortion Rights Action League, the National Women's Political Caucus, Independent Action, Handgun Control, Inc., and, after leaving the Maryland House of Delegates in 2003, the Carl M. Freeman Foundation. During her time in the Maryland House of Delegates, she was a part-time substitute teacher for Montgomery County Public Schools. She has been on the board of the American Jewish Committee (AJC) since 1999.

Kagan has also volunteered on many local and national political campaigns; for Democratic Party organizations; and for a variety of community organizations.

Community Engagement

Sen. Kagan is an active member in her community. For the past 18 years, she has hosted Folk 'N Great Music house parties with national touring singer/songwriters. She founded and is the Executive Producer of the annual UnNaugural Concerts, featuring an array of performers to raise money for unique progressive causes each year that are most affected by the Trump Administration. She wrote a chapter for the book "33 Gems: Wisdom for Living Pieces of Life's Puzzle." Kagan is also a nationally ranked Scrabble player, and was instrumental in attracting the North American Scrabble Championship to Baltimore in 2020; however, the COVID-19 pandemic has caused it to be postponed for one year.

House of Delegates
In 1994, Kagan was one of the three winners from a field of eleven candidates seeking the Democratic nomination for Maryland House of Delegates representing District 17. All three won in the general election to represent the district which included Rockville, Gaithersburg, and Garrett Park in central Montgomery County. Due to redistricting, Garrett Park is no longer part of District 17.

During her first term, she served on the Commerce and Government Matters Committee, shifting to the Appropriations Committee following her re-election in 1998. Homeowners' rights, campaign finance reform, women's issues, consumer protection, and education were among her priorities in the House. She sponsored legislation requiring insurance companies to cover in vitro fertilization and guaranteeing emergency medical care for rape victims.

Campaigns

2010 Senate campaign
In June 2009, Kagan launched an unsuccessful primary campaign for Senate against the Democratic incumbent, Jennie M. Forehand, running in the same district in which she had previously served. The race received significant media attention. Forehand, 74, sought to portray her long service in the legislature as an asset, and was supported by Maryland's powerful Senate President, Thomas V. Mike Miller, Jr. Despite his assistance, Forehand was out-raised (in campaign contributions) approximately three to one by Kagan during 2008 and 2009, something which was noted in local political blogs as being unusual for an incumbent.

2014 Senate campaign

In 2014, with the endorsement of retiring Sen. Forehand and The Washington Post, Kagan defeated Delegate Luiz R. S. Simmons in the primary. Del. Simmons, a registered Republican until 2002, ran as a Democratic after that. The race was closely watched for its competitiveness, including attack mailers from the Simmons campaign.

Then, in November's general election, Kagan went on to defeat Republican Steve Zellers by earning 2/3 of the vote.

2018 Senate campaign
Kagan successfully sought reelection in 2018. While she was uncontested in the Democratic primary, Republican Josephine J. Wang, who had unsuccessfully attempted to represent District 17 in the House three times, ran against her in the general. In November, Sen. Kagan was reelected with 79% of the vote.

Senate legislative sessions

2015 session 
In 2015, Senator Kagan was assigned to the Education, Health, and Environmental Affairs (EHEA) and Joint Audit Committees.

Kagan was the primary sponsor of six pieces of legislation (all six of which passed the Senate and five of which won final passage by the General Assembly). She secured funding for key Rockville and Gaithersburg projects; passed legislation to enhance organ donations; and mandated "fertility parity" in insurance coverage for married lesbian couples.

The Maryland Municipal League named her a "Superstar" for her work on securing highway revenue funds and other issues.

2016 session 
Senator Cheryl Kagan was the primary sponsor of 11 pieces of legislation during the 2016 legislative session. Her successes include passing "Language Access" to ensure that all State agency websites are multi-lingual; clarifying the voter registration process with her "Informed Voter" bill; and closing a loophole infertility treatment coverage for married couples. She sponsored legislation to address issues including driving under the influence of drugs and updating our 9-1-1 emergency systems. While not passed during the 2016 session, Senator Kagan continues advocating for these bills and is optimistic of their success in the near future.

Senator Kagan was appointed to serve as the Senator on The Maryland Public-Private Partnership (P3) Marketing Corporation Board, which seeks to attract and retain businesses; establish a branding strategy for the State; increase jobs; and expand the State's economy. She was also appointed to the Commission on the Commemoration of the 100th Anniversary of the Passage of the 19th Amendment to the United States Constitution. Kagan is a trustee at Hospice Caring, Inc., and a member of the One Maryland Blue Ribbon Commission on Procurement; and Women Legislators of Maryland. Additionally, in 2016 she was named a "Superstar" by the Maryland Municipal League for the second year in a row. For her dedication to the environment, Senator Kagan has a perfect, lifetime score of 100 from the Maryland League of Conservation Voters.

2017 session 
During the 2017 legislative session, Kagan was the primary sponsor of 21 pieces of legislation. Significantly, she enacted the Nonprofit, Interest-Free, Micro Bridge Loan (NIMBL) fund to help nonprofits overcome short-term cash-flow issues as they wait on incoming government grants.

She continued her dedication to Next Generation 9-1-1, securing passage of an omnibus bill in the Senate before it failed to receive a vote in the House of Delegates in the final hours of session. Additional successes included: giving cities a proven tool to combat fraud by contractors; simplifying the process to return to a former name after divorce; requiring that the State Board of Elections make audio recordings of their meetings available online; and standardizing the use of the term 'nonprofit' in the Maryland Code.

Kagan was appointed to serve as Senate Chair of the Joint Committee on the Management of Public Funds, which oversees the financial health of state and local public accounts.

The Maryland Municipal League named Kagan a "Municipal Superstar" for the third year in a row in 2017. She was included on The Daily Record's "Top 100 Women in Maryland" list, also for the third time, earning her a place in their "Circle of Excellence."

2018 session 
During the 2018 legislative session, Kagan was the primary sponsor on five successful pieces of legislation. These bills include: (1) expand translation services for all State web sites; (2) establish a Commission to help plan and facilitate the State transition to Next Generation 9-1-1; (3) limit Public Information Act access to email addresses for those who sign up for government alerts; (4) conform Maryland’s grant and contracting practices to federal standards, increasing the long-term health of the nonprofit sector; and, (5) authorize counties to provide a tax credit to 9-1-1 Specialists. Her "Freedom to Serve" legislation, which would have allowed honorably discharged veterans who were Legal Permanent Residents to become police officers passed the House of Delegates, but did not get a vote in the State Senate. Other bills she sponsored included a ban on single use expanded polystyrene foam ("Styrofoam" or EPS foam) food containers; planning for Next Generation 9-1-1 through updating Public Information Act standards; and banning grants to private schools that discriminate on the basis of race, religion, or sexual orientation.

Sen. Kagan became the first Maryland legislator to join the wave of #MeToo incidents in 2018. At a karaoke night in Annapolis, a former Delegate and current lobbyist touched her inappropriately. After she released a public statement, the lobbyist issued repeated denials. Kagan then released a video of the incident from the bar security footage. Ultimately, this helped ensure the passage of a strong sexual harassment law.

Sen. Kagan was again named a "Municipal Superstar" by the Maryland Municipal League, while the Center for Nonprofit Advancement gave The Phyllis Campbell Newsome Public Policy Leadership Award to her. The NG911 Institute recognized Kagan with its prestigious "National Leader of the Year" award.

2019 session 
During the 2019 legislative session, Kagan was the primary sponsor of 19 pieces of legislation. She chairs the Maryland Next Generation 9-1-1 (NG911) Commission which seeks to enhance our technology, cybersecurity, staffing, and oversight, as we prepare to implement NG911. Under her leadership, the Commission issued a 65-page report with 23 unanimous recommendations. Kagan sponsored and passed three significant laws to improve Maryland's 9-1-1 system:

 Saving Lives by Updating Our 9-1-1 Systems ("Carl Henn's Law" named for a late activist and constituent who died when 9-1-1 failed): This bill addressed technology, cybersecurity, staffing, oversight, and more. This comprehensive legislation also modified our funding structure, which was providing an average of just 37.5% of the costs of our emergency centers. By adjusting the 9-1-1 fee, Maryland will improve its emergency services— and save lives.
 Protecting Crime Victims: Currently, 9-1-1 audio calls are available through a Maryland Public Information Act request. With NG911 allowing us to send texts, photos, and videos, SB5 will help protect the privacy of victims of domestic abuse, sexual assault, and child abuse by giving them a voice in shielding these records.
 Supporting our "First, First Responders": Our 9-1-1 Specialists, or calltakers, help us in our worst moments. Unlike a police officer, firefighter, or paramedic, 9-1-1 Specialists are largely invisible and underappreciated. This new law reclassified and authorized appropriate compensation and benefit for these employees.

Kagan brought her nonprofit experience to the legislature, enacting at least one bill each year for the sector after being elected State Senator. Along with Delegate Joseline Peña-Melnyk, Kagan was recognized and honored as the first Legislative Champion by Maryland Nonprofits in 2019 for her leadership.

She sponsored and passed additional initiatives. After a State audit revealed that the Maryland Technology Development Corporation (TEDCO) had been investing taxpayer dollars in tech start-ups outside the State, she collaborated with now-Speaker Adrienne A. Jones to ensure that their focus remains on creating Maryland jobs. Senator Kagan partnered with Montgomery County Police Chief Tom Manger to pass her "Freedom to Serve" legislation, which will diversify our police departments by allowing Legal Permanent Residents who have been honorably discharged from the military the opportunity to become police officers.

Along with her legislative successes, she was appointed as the Senate Chair of the Joint Committee on Administrative, Executive, and Legislative Review.

2020 session 
New Senate President Bill Ferguson chose Kagan to be a part of his leadership team, appointing her as Vice Chair of the Education, Health and Environmental Affairs Committee. In addition to the 3 subjects in the title, this committee also manages all election law, procurement, alcohol bills, and much more.

Kagan is a nationally-recognized advocate on Next Generation 9-1-1 (NG911). Inspired by the death of Rockville activist and District 17 resident Carl Henn when 9-1-1 failed, she continues to chair the Maryland NG911 Commission. With the second annual NG911 Commission's 65-page report with 23 unanimously approved recommendations, Kagan sponsored four bills (SB838/HB934, SB61, SB47, SB363/HB421) that were enacted during the abbreviated 2020 session, resulting in:

 Increasing investment in our "First First Responders" (or 9-1-1 Specialists) by providing  access to health and wellness services for the cumulative impact of chronic exposure to trauma;
 Authorizing the Comptroller's Office to conduct audits of 9-1-1 fee collection and remittance;
 Investing in enhanced software to locate cell phone callers requesting emergency services; 
 Funding for a statewide public education for NG911 implementation — including text-to-9-1-1; 
 Ensuring compliance when dialing 9-1-1 without a prefix from any location, including hotels and office buildings; 
 Creating a statewide Telecommunicator Emergency Response Team specially trained to assist after disasters or crises; and
 Extending the Commission's duration for two more years to oversee the implementation of NG911; study any unforeseen complications; and endorse needed legislation.

During the 2020 session, Kagan also passed legislation on:
 Telehealth (SB402 - 2020) - Sen. Kagan passed legislation that allows healthcare practitioners to interact with patients virtually—because of the COVID-19 pandemic, this emergency bill was the first signed into law from the 2020 session;
 Postage-Paid Absentee Ballots (SB145 - 2020) - this emergency legislation requires mail-in ballots to include pre-paid postage;
 Increased Transparency for Key Government Entities (SB363 - 2020) - requires specified agencies to post meeting agendas on their website 48 hours in advance; live video-stream the public portions of their meetings; and post the minutes within 2 business days after they are approved; and,
 "Common Application" (SB630 - 2020) - Sen. Kagan enacted a law to streamline the application process for nonprofits seeking State grants or contracts.

References

Democratic Party members of the Maryland House of Delegates
Democratic Party Maryland state senators
Living people
Women state legislators in Maryland
1961 births
Vassar College alumni
University of Maryland, College Park alumni
21st-century American politicians
21st-century American women politicians